Andrew Robert Miller IV (born September 18, 1988) is an American ice hockey player who is currently an unrestricted free agent. He most recently played for Kunlun Red Star of the Kontinental Hockey League (KHL). Undrafted, he has formerly played for the Edmonton Oilers.

Playing career
In his senior collegiate season in 2012–13, Miller was instrumental in helping Yale to the National Championship, scoring the overtime winning goal in the semi-final against UMass Lowell to send Yale to its first ever National Championship game. Miller scored the third goal and assisted on an empty netted goal with 6:38 left in the Championship game, to go up 4–0 on Quinnipiac.

On April 17, 2013, the Edmonton Oilers agreed to terms with Miller on a one-year entry level contract. On July 15, 2014, the Edmonton Oilers agreed to terms for another one-year deal for the 2014–15 season.

On March 27, 2015 he scored his first NHL goal against Kari Lehtonen of the Dallas Stars during a penalty shot. Miller is the first player in Oilers franchise history to score his first NHL goal on a penalty shot.

In the following 2015–16 season, Miller featured in a further 6 scoreless games with the Oilers, but was primarily assigned to the AHL affiliate Bakersfield Condors. After producing 39 points in 44 games with the Condors, Miller was loaned by the Oilers to the Charlotte Checkers, an affiliate to the Carolina Hurricanes in exchange for Zach Boychuk on March 7, 2016.

While Miller was released to free agency by the Oilers in the off-season, he opted to remain with the Carolina Hurricanes, agreeing to a one-year, two-way contract on July 1, 2016.

On June 13, 2017, the Hurricanes re-signed Miller to a one-year, two-way contract worth $650,000 at the NHL level, and $285,000 at the AHL level, with a guarantee of $305,000.

On May 1, 2018, Miller signed a one-year contract with HC Fribourg-Gottéron of the National League (NL). In his debut European 2018–19 season, Miller contributed offensively with 11 goals and 27 points in 40 games with Fribourg-Gottéron.

After missing the post-season with Fribourg-Gottéron, Miller left Switzerland at the conclusion of his contract and signed a two-year contract with Chinese club, HC Kunlun Red Star of the KHL, on May 23, 2019.

Career statistics

Awards and honors

References

External links
 

1988 births
Living people
American men's ice hockey forwards
Bakersfield Condors players
Charlotte Checkers (2010–) players
Edmonton Oilers players
HC Fribourg-Gottéron players
Ice hockey players from Michigan
HC Kunlun Red Star players
Oklahoma City Barons players
People from Bloomfield Hills, Michigan
Undrafted National Hockey League players
Yale Bulldogs men's ice hockey players
AHCA Division I men's ice hockey All-Americans
American expatriate ice hockey players in China
American expatriate ice hockey players in Switzerland